The Seguros Bolívar Open San José is a tennis tournament held in San José, Costa Rica since 2011. The event is part of the ATP Challenger Tour and is played on hard courts.

Past finals

Singles

Doubles

References

External links
Official Site

ATP Challenger Tour
Hard court tennis tournaments
Tennis tournaments in Costa Rica